Oscar S. Heizer (February 7, 1868 – August 1, 1956) was an American diplomat who served in various posts as Consul General in the Ottoman Empire. Heizer, who was the Consul General in Trebizond during World War I, witnessed the Armenian genocide and often risked his own life to save the lives of Armenians.

Armenian genocide

Oscar S. Heizer was one of the first individuals to report the mass murder of Armenians. During the Armenian Genocide, Heizer was the Consul General of Trabzon, a city on the coast of the Black Sea. During the Genocide, Heizer's initial reporting to the American consulate stationed in Constantinople states that it was authorized "whenever the parents so desire" to leave children – girls up to the age of 15 and boys up to the age of ten – in the "orphanages by the Turks." Heizer also describes how some children were assimilated into Muslim Turks in a matter of weeks.

Heizer also uncovered the direct link between the central government in Constantinople and a local Committee of Union and Progress functionary Nail Bey. In a letter to the American ambassador in Constantinople, Heizer writes: "The real authority here seems to be in the hands of a committee of which Nail Bey is the head and apparently receives his orders from Constantinople and not from the vali (governor)." Heizer also reveals that Nail Bey insisted that Armenian children be deported rather than being cared for.

Heizer reported how Armenians were being thrown overboard in boats: "This plan did not suit Nail Bey ... Many of the children were loaded into boats and taken out to sea and thrown overboard. I myself saw where 16 bodies were washed ashore and buried by a Greek woman near the Italian monastery." Heizer also states that a group of members of the Armenian Revolutionary Federation were placed on a boat and drowned.

According to the report of Oscar Heizer written to ambassador Henry Morgenthau, the first convoy of deportees was put on the road on July 1, 1915. On that day, troops surrounded certain Armenian neighborhoods of Trabzon and proceed to expel 2,000 inhabitants of the city, who then were taken in small groups to a place known as Deyirmen Dere, located ten minutes outside the city, and from there led off in the direction of Gümüşhane. A total of 6,000 people left the city between July 1 and July 3; approximately 4,000 more left the surrounding villages. Initially, the authorities had declared that Catholics and Protestants, as well as incapacitated old people, children, and pregnant women, would be "maintained". However, no exceptions were made, and the exempted individuals were dispatched with the last convoy that set out on July 5.

Heizer stated that most of the deportees were murdered shortly after they were told to leave. He described the situation of the Armenians when the deportations began:

The deportations measures throughout the province of Trabzon were also applied to 16 localities located south and west of the center, with an Armenian population of around 7,000, 3,517 of which lived in the province of Akcabat. Heizer reported that the men in these localities were apparently killed in their villages by members of the Special Organization.

Heizer also described the circumstances of life insurance policies of the deportees. Heizer describes in a letter to Morgenthau about the life insurance policies left behind by the deportees at Reverend Robert Stapleton's residence (member of the American Mission in Erzurum). Stapleton invited Heizer to discuss what to do with the insurance policies of the deportees. Heizer describes the visit as follows:

Oscar S. Heizer also reported to the American Embassy in Istanbul in July 1915 about the confiscation of Armenian goods and property:

Heizer was later assigned to Baghdad where he continued to witness the execution of Armenians. Heizer describes what he witnessed as follows:

Later life
Heizer returned to the United States and was placed in charge of a governmental fund for the refugees of the Catastrophe of Smyrna. Heizer was in contact with many agencies throughout Greece and managed to collect $200,000 for the fund.

In 1923, Heizer was appointed American Consul in Jerusalem. In 1928, was acknowledged by American Jewish leaders as a great supporter of Zionism.

Heizer was married three times.  He died August 1, 1956, and is buried at the Elmwood Cemetery in Charlotte, North Carolina.

See also

Trabzon during the Armenian Genocide
Witnesses and testimonies of the Armenian genocide

References

1869 births
1956 deaths
American diplomats
American consuls
Witnesses of the Armenian genocide
People from Charlotte, North Carolina